Jean Raphael Vanderlei Moreira (born 24 June 1986), simply known as Jean, is a Brazilian professional  footballer who last played as a defensive midfielder and a right back for Palmeiras.

Born in Campo Grande, Mato Grosso do Sul, Jean made his professional debut for São Paulo in a 1–2 away defeat to Santos in the Campeonato Brasileiro on 17 July 2005.

On 13 November 2012 Jean was called up, by Mano Menezes, for Brazil that will play Superclásico de las Américas, making, then, his début for Seleção.

Career statistics

International
Games for Brazilian team

Honours

Club
São Paulo
 Campeonato Brasileiro Série A: 2008

Fluminense
 Campeonato Carioca: 2012
 Taça Guanabara: 2012
 Campeonato Brasileiro Série A: 2012

Palmeiras
 Campeonato Brasileiro Série A: 2016, 2018

International
Brazil
 Superclásico de las Américas: 2012
 FIFA Confederations Cup: 2013

Individual
 Bola de Prata: 2016
 Campeonato Brasileiro Série A Team of the Year: 2012, 2016

References

External links

1986 births
Living people
People from Campo Grande
Brazilian footballers
Association football defenders
Association football midfielders
Campeonato Brasileiro Série A players
Campeonato Brasileiro Série B players
São Paulo FC players
América Futebol Clube (SP) players
Marília Atlético Clube players
Fluminense FC players
Sociedade Esportiva Palmeiras players
Cruzeiro Esporte Clube players
Liga Portugal 2 players
F.C. Penafiel players
2013 FIFA Confederations Cup players
FIFA Confederations Cup-winning players
Brazil international footballers
Brazilian expatriate footballers
Brazilian expatriate sportspeople in Portugal
Expatriate footballers in Portugal
Sportspeople from Mato Grosso do Sul